Oluwole Alani Adeosun (1938 - 2012) was a Nigerian banker who was chief executive officer of NAL Merchant Bank from 1979 to 1987 and then First Bank of Nigeria from 1987 to 1990. He was appointed Secretary of Transportation in the Transitional National Government of Ernest Shonekan in 1993.

Adeosun had important roles in Nigeria's indigenization programme, Institute of Chartered Accountants, Lagos Chamber of Commerce's, finance trade group and also within the Abeokuta and Lagos Anglican community.

Life
Adeosun is an Egba native of Abeokuta and was educated at Abeokuta Grammar School. After completing his secondary school studies, he worked at the regional Ministry of Agriculture and Natural Resources, Ibadan from 1959 to 1962, first as an agricultural assistant trainee and promoted to a supervisory role. He obtained a scholarship to study agricultural economics in U.K. and attended Holborn college and University of Bradford, earning a degree in economics at the latter in 1967. He worked in London at Coopers and Lybrand and qualified as a chartered accountant in 1970. He was posted to their branch in Lagos in 1971 as a senior accountant, one of his major projects was as a team of auditors handling the decimal conversion of the Nigerian currency. In 1973, he left the accountancy firm to become an investment executive with NAL Merchant Bank. At NAL, his first major assignment was defending valuations of large companies interested in quoting shares on the Nigerian Stock Exchange at the Securities and Exchange Commission which was then known as the Capital Issues Commission. In 1975, he was appointed head of an industrial enterprises panel to review the progress of the Indigenization decree that came into effect in 1973. the commission later recommended amendment to the decree and an expanded role of Nigerians through increased equity participation of citizens in activities beyond those granted by the previous decree.

He was appointed CEO of NAL in 1979. In 1987, he became managing director of First Bank.

References

Nigerian bankers
1938 births
2012 deaths
People from Abeokuta